William Reeves Eason (October 2, 1886 – June 9, 1956), known as B. Reeves Eason, was an American film director, actor and screenwriter. His directorial output was limited mainly to low-budget westerns and action pictures, but it was as a second-unit director and action specialist that he was best known. He was famous for staging spectacular battle scenes in war films and action scenes in large-budget westerns, but he acquired the nickname "Breezy" for his "breezy" attitude towards safety while staging his sequences—during the famous cavalry charge at the end of Charge of the Light Brigade (1936), so many horses were killed or injured so severely that they had to be euthanized that both the public and Hollywood itself were outraged, resulting in the selection of the American Humane Society by the beleaguered studios to provide representatives on the sets of all films using animals to ensure their safety.

Career 
Born in Massachusetts, Eason studied engineering at the University of California. Eason directed 150 films and starred in almost 100 films over his career. Eason's career transcended into sound and he directed film serials such as The Miracle Rider starring Tom Mix in 1935. He used 42 cameras to film the chariot race as a second-unit director on Ben-Hur (1925), the climactic charge in Charge of the Light Brigade (1936), and also directed the "Burning of Atlanta" in Gone with the Wind (1939).

Family and personal life 
His son, B. Reeves Eason Jr., was a child actor who appeared in 12 films, including Nine-Tenths of the Law, which Eason, Sr. directed. Born in 1914, he died in 1921 after being hit by a runaway truck outside of his parents' home shortly after the filming of the Harry Carey silent western The Fox was completed, just before his seventh birthday.

Death 
On June 9, 1956, Eason died of a heart attack at the age of 69. He is buried in Hollywood Forever Cemetery in Los Angeles.

Filmography

Director 

 1915 : Competition
 1915 : The Day of Reckoning
 1915 : She Walketh Alone
 1915 : The Poet of the Peaks
 1915 : A Good Business Deal
 1915 : Mountain Mary
 1915 : To Melody a Soul Responds
 1915 : The Honor of the District Attorney
 1915 : After the Storm
 1915 : The Newer Way
 1915 : The Exile of Bar-K Ranch
 1915 : Drawing the Line
 1915 : A Question of Honor
 1915 : The Spirit of Adventure
 1915 : In Trust
 1915 : The Little Lady Next Door
 1915 : The Barren Gain
 1915 : Hearts in Shadow
 1915 : Profit from Loss
 1915 : The Blot on the Shield
 1915 : The Smuggler's Cave
 1915 : The Wasp
 1915 : To Rent Furnished
 1915 : The Substitute Minister
 1915 : The Bluffers
 1915 : The Silver Lining
 1915 : The Assayer of Lone Gap
 1915 : The Solution to the Mystery
 1916 : Matching Dreams
 1916 : Time and Tide
 1916 : Viviana
 1916 : A Sanitarium Scramble
 1916 : Shadows
 1918 : Nine-Tenths of the Law
 1919 : The Fighting Heart
 1919 : The Four-Bit Man
 1919 : The Jack of Hearts
 1919 : The Crow
 1919 : The Tell Tale Wire
 1919 : The Fighting Line
 1919 : The Kid and the Cowboy
 1920 : The Prospector's Vengeance
 1920 : Hair Trigger Stuff
 1920 : Held Up for the Makin's
 1920 : The Rattler's Hiss
 1920 : His Nose in the Book
 1920 : The Moon Riders
 1920 : Human Stuff
 1920 : Blue Streak McCoy
 1920 : Pink Tights
 1920 : Two Kinds of Love
 1921 : The Big Adventure
 1921 : Colorado
 1921 : Red Courage
 1921 : The Fire Eater
 1922 : Pardon My Nerve!
 1922 : When East Comes West
 1922 : Roughshod
 1922 : The Lone Hand
 1923 : Around the World in Eighteen Days
 1923 : His Last Race
 1924 : Treasure Canyon
 1924 : Tiger Thompson
 1924 : Women First
 1924 : Trigger Fingers 
 1924 : Flashing Spurs
 1925 : The Texas Bearcat
 1925 : Fighting Youth
 1925 : Border Justice
 1925 : Fighting the Flames
 1925 : The New Champion
 1925 : A Fight to the Finish
 1925 : The Shadow on the Wall
 1926 : The Test of Donald Norton
 1926 : The Sign of the Claw
 1926 : Lone Hand Saunders
 1927 : Johnny Get Your Hair Cut
 1927 : The Denver Dude
 1927 : The Prairie King
 1927 : Painted Ponies
 1927 : Through Thick and Thin
 1927 : Galloping Fury
 1928 : A Trick of Hearts
 1928 : The Flyin' Cowboy
 1928 : Riding for Fame
 1928 : Clearing the Trail
 1929 : The Lariat Kid
 1929 : The Winged Horseman
 1930 : Troopers Three
 1930 : Roaring Ranch
 1930 : Trigger Tricks
 1930 : Spurs
 1931 : King of the Wild
 1931 : The Vanishing Legion
 1931 : The Galloping Ghost
 1932 : The Sunset Trail
 1932 : The Shadow of the Eagle
 1932 : The Last of the Mohicans
 1932 : The Honor of the Press
 1932 : Cornered
 1932 : Heart Punch
 1932 : Behind Jury Doors
 1933 : Revenge at Monte Carlo
 1933 : Alimony Madness
 1933 : Her Resale Value
 1933 : Dance Hall Hostess
 1933 : Neighbors' Wives
 1934 : Hollywood Hoodlum
 1934 : The Law of the Wild (Le Démon noir)
 1934 : Mystery Mountain
 1935 : The Phantom Empire (La Reine de l'empire fantôme)
 1935 : The Miracle Rider (Le Cavalier miracle)
 1935 : The Adventures of Rex and Rinty
 1935 : The Fighting Marines
 1936 : Darkest Africa
 1936 : Red River Valley
 1936 : Undersea Kingdom
 1936 : Give Me Liberty
 1937 : Land Beyond the Law
 1937 : Empty Holsters
 1937 : Prairie Thunder
 1938 : Sergeant Murphy
 1938 : The Kid Comes Back
 1938 : Daredevil Drivers
 1938 : Call of the Yukon
 1939 : Blue Montana Skies
 1939 : Mountain Rhythm
 1940 : Men with Steel Faces
 1940 : Pony Express Days
 1940 : Young America Flies
 1940 : Service with the Colors
 1940 : March On, Marines
 1940 : Meet the Fleet
 1941 : The Tanks Are Coming
 1942 : Soldiers in White
 1942 : Murder in the Big House
 1942 : Spy Ship
 1942 : Men of the Sky
 1943 : Truck Busters
 1943 : Mechanized Patrolling
 1943 : Oklahoma Outlaws
 1943 : Murder on the Waterfront
 1943 : Wagon Wheels West
 1943 : The Phantom
 1944 : The Desert Hawk
 1944 : Black Arrow
 1945 : Salome Where She Danced (chase sequences, billed as Breezy Eason)
 1946 : 'Neath Canadian Skies
 1946 : North of the Border
 1949 : Rimfire

Actor 

 1913 : The Step Brothers
 1913 : A Divorce Scandal
 1913 : Armed Intervention
 1913 : The Shriner's Daughter
 1914 : The Miser's Policy
 1914 : The Return of Helen Redmond
 1914 : The Hermit
 1914 : The Lost Treasure
 1914 : The Money Lender
 1914 : The Dream Child
 1914 : The Second Clue
 1914 : The Smouldering Spark
 1914 : In the Moonlight
 1914 : Calamity Anne's Love Affair
 1914 : A Soul Astray
 1914 : Beyond the City
 1914 : The Lost Sermon
 1914 : A Prince of Bohemia
 1914 : Sparrow of the Circus
 1914 : Feast and Famine
 1914 : The Aftermath
 1914 : Break, Break, Break
 1914 : His Faith in Humanity
 1914 : Jail Birds
 1914 : In the Open
 1914 : Sir Galahad of Twilight
 1914 : Redbird Wins
 1914 : The Strength o' Ten
 1915 : The Unseen Vengeance
 1915 : The Black Ghost Bandit
 1915 : The Legend Beautiful
 1915 : The Law of the Wilds
 1915 : A Heart of Gold : Fred
 1915 : In the Twilight
 1915 : Heart of Flame
 1915 : The Echo : Ferryman
 1915 : Competition
 1915 : The Guy Upstairs
 1917 : Hell Hath No Fury
 1918 : Nine-Tenths of the Law : 'Red Adair
 1920 : Two Kinds of Love : Dorgan
 1928 : The Danger Rider : Tucson Joe

Screenwriter 

 1920 : Pink Tights
 1918 : Nine-Tenths of the Law
 1920 : The Prospector's Vengeance
 1920 : Human Stuff
 1928 : The Flyin' Cowboy
 1928 : Riding for Fame
 1930 : Trigger Tricks
 1930 : Spurs
 1934 : The Law of the Wild serial (Le Démon noir)

References

External links 

 
 

1886 births
1956 deaths
American male film actors
American film directors
American male screenwriters
American male silent film actors
American television directors
Burials at Hollywood Forever Cemetery
Film serial crew
Silent film directors
Male actors from New York City
20th-century American male actors
Screenwriters from New York (state)
Silent film screenwriters
20th-century American male writers
20th-century American screenwriters